Peloponnese Airport may refer to one of the airports listed below.

 Araxos Airport, serving Patras
 Kalamata International Airport, serving Kalamata

Military airports:
 Andravida Air Base
 Sparti Airport
 Tripoli Airport

Closed airports:
 Porto Cheli Airport, a private airport located near Porto Cheli
 Triodos Airport